Marlon James (born 24 November 1970) is a Jamaican writer. He is the author of five novels: John Crow's Devil (2005), The Book of Night Women (2009), A Brief History of Seven Killings (2014), which won him the 2015 Man Booker Prize, Black Leopard, Red Wolf (2019), and Moon Witch, Spider King (2022). Now living in Minneapolis, Minnesota, in the U.S., James teaches literature at Macalester College in St. Paul, Minnesota. He is also a faculty lecturer at St. Francis College's Low Residency MFA in Creative Writing.

Early life and education
James was born in Kingston, Jamaica, to parents who were both in the Jamaican police: his mother (who gave him his first prose book, a collection of stories by O. Henry) became a detective and his father (from whom James took a love of Shakespeare and Coleridge) a lawyer. James attended Kingston's prestigious Wolmer's Trust High School for Boys. He is a 1991 graduate of the University of the West Indies, where he read Language and Literature. He left Jamaica to escape anti-gay violence and economic conditions that he felt would mean career stagnation, later explaining: "Whether it was in a plane or a coffin, I knew I had to get out of Jamaica." He received a master's degree in creative writing from Wilkes University in Pennsylvania (2006).

Career
James' first novel, John Crow's Devil (2005) – which was rejected 70 times before being accepted for publication – tells the story of a biblical struggle in a remote Jamaican village in 1957. His second novel, The Book of Night Women (2009), is about a slave woman's revolt in a Jamaican plantation in the early 19th century. His 2014 novel, A Brief History of Seven Killings, explores several decades of Jamaican history and political instability through the perspectives of many narrators. It won the fiction category of the 2015 OCM Bocas Prize for Caribbean Literature and the 2015 Man Booker Prize for Fiction, having been the first book by a Jamaican author ever to be shortlisted. He is the second Caribbean winner of the prize, following Trinidad-born V. S. Naipaul who won in 1971. James's most recent work, Moon Witch, Spider King (2022) is the second in a planned fantasy series which began with Black Leopard, Red Wolf (2019).

James has taught English and creative writing at Macalester College in St. Paul, Minnesota, since 2007. He is also a faculty lecturer at St. Francis College's Low Residency MFA in Creative Writing.

In February 2019, James gave the seventh annual Tolkien Lecture at Pembroke College, Oxford.

In 2020, James began co-hosting with his editor Jake Morrissey a literary podcast called "Marlon and Jake Read Dead People" that explores, in a casual setting, the work of deceased authors.

In 2021, James had begun writing his first television series for HBO and Channel 4 titled Get Millie Black.

Themes 
Themes in James's work span religion and the supernatural, sexuality, violence, and colonialism. Often, his novels display the struggle to find an identity, whether it be as a slave or a postcolonial inhabitant of Jamaica.

John Crow's Devil (2005)
In John Crow's Devil, his first novel, James explores postcolonial Jamaica through a religiously charged, archetypal battle of good and evil.  His characters in this novel represent, through their archetypal portrayals, many facets of humanity including hope.  Despite the particular setting, the novel "conveys archetypal situations that reside in the collective unconsciousness." Additionally, this piece of Caribbean gothic reveals the power of guilt and hypocrisy both in a person and in a community, and generally reveals truths of human nature.  The ghosts of colonialism are more subtle, but the instability and struggle for identity is clear to the reader.

The Book of Night Women (2009)
In The Book of Night Women, James challenges the traditional slave narrative by presenting a protagonist (Lilith) who approaches her enslavement with complex duality, despite the constant description of antagonism between slaves and masters on a plantation in Jamaica. Lilith hates the masters, but much of the novel deals with how she "aspires to obtain a privileged stature within plantation society by submitting to the sexual subjugation of a white overseer, Robert Quinn". This is additionally challenged by Lilith and Robert's "love", leading the reader to question the limits of love and relationships.  James intends to have readers root for Robert and Lilith, but then catch themselves, as Robert Quinn has a reputation as a brutal, violent overseer—even ordering Lilith to be severely whipped. The situation for the reader is further complicated because Quinn is Irish, another population that was looked down upon during the time period.  While this at times brings him sympathy, his whiteness overshadows his Irishness.

Additionally, the novel explores the complexity of what it is to be a woman, with some characters having deep connections to Obeah and Myal spiritualism.  The female slaves are portrayed as strong-willed and intelligent, while the male slaves are often portrayed as weak, thoughtless, and even traitorous.  "Rape, torture, murder and other dehumanizing acts propel the narrative, never failing to shock in both their depravity and their humanness. It is this complex intertwining that makes James’s book so disturbing and so eloquent". The novel "defies hegemonic notions of empire by pointing out the explosive and antagonistic relationship between colonizers and colonized."

A Brief History of Seven Killings (2014)
James's 2014 novel, A Brief History of Seven Killings, portrays "a passionate, often angry account of postcolonial society struggling to balance identity and a burgeoning criminal element." The novel has twelve narrators, contributing to the "excess" that Sheri-Marie Harrison explores in her article "Excess in A Brief History of Seven Killings". She explains: "James's rejection of a purely nationalist tradition, like that of other authors in his cohort, concretizes his critique of the ways nationalism distracts us from the increased deregulation of global capital and its production of material inequality around the globe. This disruption of privileged tropes in the interest of turning attention onto the transnational forces that structure inequality helps to explain James's use of 'a poetics of excess.' His experimentation with form functions to rework now familiar paradigms and themes that have been central to the literary imagination of postcolonial realities for a little over half a century."

Black Leopard, Red Wolf (2019)
His book, Black Leopard, Red Wolf (2019) — characterized as "an African Game of Thrones — is the first instalment of a planned trilogy. It has been described by NPR journalist Ari Shapiro as "an epic fantasy quest — full of monsters, sex, and violence, set in a mythic version of ancient Africa." According to TIME magazine, the novel "joins the ranks of those by authors like Tomi Adeyemi and N. K. Jemisin, whose works push back against stereotypes about the types of figures who 'should' appear in fantasy fiction."

Warner Bros. and Michael B. Jordan's production company Outlier Society acquired the book's film rights in 2019.

Moon Witch, Spider King (2022)
The sequel to Black Leopard, Red Wolf in 2022, titled Moon Witch, Spider King, was published by Riverhead in 2022.

Influences 
James's influences include authors as well as musicians.  In his acceptance speech for the Man Booker Prize in 2015, James explained: "The reggae singers Bob Marley and Peter Tosh were the first to recognize that the voice coming out our mouths was a legitimate voice for fiction and for poetry." In other words, these singers empowered other artists such as James to create.  In his popular 2015 essay "From Jamaica to Minnesota to Myself", published in the New York Times Magazine, James describes reading Salman Rushdie's novel Shame (1983): "Its prose was so audacious, its reality so unhinged, that you didn't see at first how pointedly political and just plain furious it was.  It made me realize that the present was something I could write my way out of."

James has said that he re-read Ben Okri's 1991 novel The Famished Road while writing Black Leopard, Red Wolf: "Okri is such an influence on me. I've read Famished Road like four times."

A lifelong fan of comics, James has cited comic characters such as "Hellboy" as an influence on his work, citing comics' ability to blend genres as an inspiration to his own approach to writing fiction.

Tone and style 
James's work carries a unique style, often referred to as disturbing, brutal, and violent, leading him to be compared in one review to Quentin Tarantino, who is known for his excessive use of violence in his films. James does not hold back in his graphic descriptions of sexual and violent acts, which contributes to the raw nature of his writing.  "James does not set out to entertain, he does not want readers to be entertained by shocking events: he believes they should be rightly horrified…"  His work is challenging and lyrical, and he often uses Jamaican Patois in dialogue, and often uses multiple dialects for different characters. His style strays from traditional and expected Caribbean literature by "creating wild and risky new possibilities for thinking about the region's place in our contemporary reality." James has stated that he commits offences in his writing that he would not allow his students to commit, "such as writing seven-page sentences." James's writing has been compared to that of Toni Morrison, William Faulkner, and Gabriel García Márquez.

Reception 
Reception of James's novels has been conflicted—the same elements that some critics find to be strengths, others believe are his weaknesses.  The conflicting nature of how readers and reviewers respond stems from reactions to the often upfront brutality juxtaposed with the mechanical elements that James uses to tell his stories.  One critic writes: "The linguistic and stylistic excess which dominates A Brief History of Seven Killings both elevates it and burdens it."  Another reviewer explained, "I have had conversations with fellow Caribbeanists and students in which they have used terms like 'orgiastic' and 'masturbatory' to describe James's writing." When reviewing The Book of Night Women, another critic explains: "Rape, torture, murder and other dehumanizing acts propel the narrative, never failing to shock in both their depravity and their humanness. It is this complex intertwining that makes James’s book so disturbing and so eloquent."

Awards and honours 
In 2013, James received a Silver Musgrave Medal from the Institute of Jamaica.

In 2019, he was named one ofTime's 100 Most Influential People. The same year, The Guardian, Kirkus Reviews, and Shelf Awareness named Black Leopard, Red Wolf one of the best books of the year.

In 2022, Kirkus Reviews, NPR, Publishers Weekly named Moon Witch, Spider King one of the best books of the year.

Works

Stand-alone literature

The Dark Star trilogy

Television 
Get Millie Black (TBA)

See also 

 Caribbean literature
 Postcolonial literature

References

Further reading
Battersby, Eileen. "Booker Winner Marlon James Tops Tarantino for Body Count". Contemporary Literary Criticism, edited by Lawrence J. Trudeau, vol. 405, Gale, 2017. Literature Resource Center
Frank, Alex. "Marlon James on Winning the Man Booker Prize, Fictionalizing Bob Marley, and Why He Loves Kendrick Lamar", Vogue, 1 February 2017.
Gifford, Sheryl. "(Re)Making Men, Representing the Caribbean Nation: Individuation in the Works of Fred D’Aguiar, Robert Antoni, and Marlon James." Diss. Florida Atlantic University, 2013. Print.
Harrison, Sheri-Marie. "Excess in a Brief History of Seven Killings." Post45, 24 October 2015.
James, Marlon. "From Jamaica to Minnesota to Myself", The New York Times, 10 March 2015.  
.
Ozuna, Ana. "Feminine Power: Women Contesting Plantocracy in The Book of Night Women", Journal of Pan African Studies, vol. 10, no. 3, 2017, pp. 132+. Literature Resource Center.
Polk, James. "Spiritual Combat". Review of John Crow's Devil, by Marlon James. The New York Times, 13 November 2005: 54.
Thomson, Ian. "God 'and Rum' on the Rocks". Review of John Crow's Devil, by Marlon James. The Independent, 28 October 2005: 21.

External links

 Paul Holdengraber, "Marlon James needs noise to write (and other revelations)" (interview), The Literary Hub, 10 August 2017.
 Joshua Jelly-Schapiro, "A Caribbean Literary Renaissance" (interview), NYR Daily, 1 March 2018.

1970 births
21st-century Jamaican novelists
21st-century male writers
American Book Award winners
American gay writers
Booker Prize winners
Jamaican emigrants to the United States
Jamaican male novelists
LGBT people from Minnesota
Jamaican LGBT novelists
Living people
Macalester College faculty
People from Kingston, Jamaica
Recipients of the Musgrave Medal
University of the West Indies alumni
Wilkes University alumni
Writers from Minneapolis
Gay novelists